Wasmund is a surname. Notable people with the surname include:

Billy Wasmund (1887–1911), American football player and coach
Shaa Wasmund (born 1972), British businesswoman